The Danish National Symphony Orchestra (Danish: DR Symfoniorkestret; English abbreviation "DNSO"), is a Danish orchestra based in Copenhagen. The DNSO is the principal orchestra of DR (Danish Broadcasting Corporation). The DRSO is based at the Koncerthuset (lit. translation in english, The Concert House) concert hall in Copenhagen.

History 
The roots of the orchestra date back to the singer Emil Holm, who expressed a wish to establish a full-time symphony orchestra in Denmark. In collaboration with fellow musicians Otto Fessel, Rudolf Dietz Mann and Folmer Jensen, the orchestra was founded in 1925, with 11 players in the ensemble and conductor Launy Grøndahl having a leadership role, though without a formal title. The orchestra grew to 30 players within a year. The orchestra performed its first public concert in 1927, and began to give weekly concerts in 1928. In 1930, Holm recruited Nikolai Malko to a similar key role like Grøndahl as conductor with the orchestra, though again without Malko having a formal title. Early concerts were at the Axelborg building. In 1931, the orchestra began to give concerts at the Stærekassen hall of the Royal Danish Theatre. After going into exile from Germany in the 1930s, Fritz Busch worked extensively as a major conductor of the orchestra in parallel with Malko, though again with no formal title.  By 1948, the orchestra had attained membership of 92 musicians.

The first conductor to have the formal title of principal conductor with the orchestra was Herbert Blomstedt, from 1967 to 1977.  His recording work with the orchestra included recordings of the orchestral works of Carl Nielsen. Blomstedt now has the title of æresdirigent (honorary conductor) with the DNSO. The second principal conductor, after an interregnum of 9 years, was Lamberto Gardelli, from 1986 to 1988.  Thomas Dausgaard, who was the DNSO's principal guest conductor from 2001 to 2004, became principal conductor of the DNSO in 2004, the first Danish conductor to hold the title. In October 2009, Dausgaard chose to conclude his principal conductorship of the DNSO at the close of the 2010–2011 season and to take the title of æresdirigent. Past principal guest conductors of the DRSO, besides Dausgaard, have included Yuri Temirkanov, Michael Schønwandt, and Dmitri Kitaenko.  

In 2010, the orchestra appointed Søren Nils Eichberg as its first-ever composer-in-residence. The orchestra has performed compositions by Eichberg such as the premiere of his Symphony No 3.

In February 2011, the DNSO announced the appointment Rafael Frühbeck de Burgos as principal conductor, effective with the 2012–2013 season, with an initial contract of three years through 2015. On 4 June 2014, Frühbeck de Burgos resigned as chief conductor of the orchestra, with immediate effect, in parallel with his retirement from conducting, because of health problems. In August 2014, the orchestra appointed Fabio Luisi as its next principal conductor, effective in 2017, with an initial contract through 2020. In May 2018, the orchestra announced the extension of Luisi's contract through 2023.  In August 2020, the orchestra announced a further extension of Luisi's contract through 2026.

The orchestra has recorded commercially for such labels as DaCapo and Chandos, including music of Danish composers such as August Enna, Niels Gade, Rued Langgaard, and Per Nørgård.  The orchestra has also commercially recorded such composers as Johannes Brahms.

Principal conductors
 Herbert Blomstedt (1967–1977)
 Lamberto Gardelli (1986–1988)
 Leif Segerstam (1988–1995)
 Ulf Schirmer (1995–1998)
 Gerd Albrecht (2000–2004)
 Thomas Dausgaard (2004–2011)
 Rafael Frühbeck de Burgos (2012–2014)
 Fabio Luisi (2017–present)

Danish Radio conductors affiliated with the orchestra
 Launy Grøndahl (1925–1956)
 Emil Reesen (1927–1936)
 Erik Tuxen (1936–1957)
 Mogens Wöldike (1950–1976)
 Thomas Jensen (1957–1963)

References

External links

 Official DRSO Danish-language page
 DRSO English-language official page

Danish orchestras
Musical groups established in 1925
Radio and television orchestras
Culture in Copenhagen
National orchestras
1925 establishments in Denmark